Chomachar (also Romanized as Chomāchār) is a village in Sheykh Neshin Rural District, Shanderman District, Masal County, Gilan Province, Iran. At the 2006 census, its population was 455, in 105 families.

References 

Populated places in Masal County